Choreutis xanthogramma is a moth in the family Choreutidae. It was described by Edward Meyrick in 1912. It is found in Taiwan, the Philippines, New Guinea and on the Kei Islands and Ryukyu Islands.

References

Choreutis
Moths described in 1912
Taxa named by Edward Meyrick